Aborichthys waikhomi is a species of stone loach found in the Noa-Dihing River, upper Brahmaputra basin in the Namdapha National Park and Tiger Reserve in Arunachal Pradesh, India. This fish grows to a length of  SL. 

The fish is named  in honor of ichthyologist Waikhom Vishwanath (b. 1954) of Manipur University, in thanks for his encouragement of the author’s work on this species.

References

Nemacheilidae
Fish of Asia
Freshwater fish of India
Taxa named by Laishram Kosygin
Fish described in 2012